The 1999 Westel 900 Budapest Open was a women's tennis tournament played on outdoor clay courts in Budapest in Hungary that was part of Tier IVa of the 1999 WTA Tour. It was the fourth edition of the tournament and was held from 19 April until 25 April 1999. Seventh-seeded Sarah Pitkowski won the singles title and earned $22,000 first-prize money.

Finals

Singles

 Sarah Pitkowski defeated  Cristina Torrens Valero, 6–2, 6–2
 It was Pitkowski's only singles title of her career.

Doubles

 Evgenia Kulikovskaya /  Sandra Načuk defeated  Laura Montalvo /  Virginia Ruano Pascual, 6–3, 6–4

Entrants

Seeds

Other entrants
The following players received wildcards into the doubles main draw:
  Zsófia Gubacsi /  Petra Mandula

The following players received entry from the singles qualifying draw:

  Katarzyna Straczy
  Eva Martincová
  Zsófia Gubacsi
  Martina Suchá

The following player received entry as a lucky loser:

  Sandra Dopfer

External links
 ITF tournament edition details
 Tournament draws

Westel 900 Budapest Open
Budapest Grand Prix
Buda
Buda